Yakutsk Time (YAKT) is a time zone in Russia which is nine hours ahead of UTC, and six hours ahead of Moscow Time (MSK).

The time zone covers Sakha Republic (western part), Amur Oblast and Zabaykalsky Krai.

On 27 March 2011, Russia moved to year-round daylight saving time.  Instead of switching between UTC+09:00 in winter and UTC+10:00 in summer, Yakutsk Time became fixed at UTC+10:00 until 2014, when it was reset back to UTC+09:00 year-round.

See also 
Time in Russia

References

Time zones
Time in Russia